Lhaviyani Atoll (also known as Faadhippolhu Atoll) is an administrative division of the Maldives. Its abbreviation is Lh.

Lhaviyani Atoll is located between 5° 15" and 5° 35" N and between 73° 20" and 74° 40" E. The capital of the atoll is Naifaru. There are a total of 54 islands in the atoll of which only 4 are inhabited: namely Naifaru, Hinnavaru, Kurendhoo and Olhuvelifushi.

The island of Maafilaafushi was resettled in the 1980s in order to relieve the lack of land availability in Malé. The island once served as the capital of the separatist Kingdom of Boduthiladhunmathi. In Mohamed Rannabadeyri Thakuru with the help of Adhi Raja of Cannanore attacked Male' and tried to overthrow the kingdom of Ibrahim Kalaafaanu (Sultan Ibrahim III 1585–1609) in However being unable to take control of the capital Male' they fled to Faadhippolhu where Mohamed Rannabadeyri controlled the northern atolls of the Maldives until he was overthrown by Sultan Muhammad Imaduddin I (1620-1648).

There are eight resorts in the atoll, namely  Thilamaafushi, Kuredhu, Komandoo, Kanuhuraa Palmbeach, Kanifushi, Innahura and Hudhuranfushi. The only canning factory in the country is in Felivaru located between Naifaru and Hinnavaru.

Traditionally, Maldivians call this atoll simply 'Faadhippolhu', without adding the word 'Atholhu' at the end. This is done only with the names of some atolls. In the early 12th century, during the reign of King Koimala Siri Mahaabarana Mahaa Radun- the first king to rule over all the Maldive islands- this atoll was called Faadu Bur.

Haa Alifu, Haa Dhaalu, Shaviyani, Noonu, Raa, Baa, Kaafu, etc. (including Lhaviyani) are code letters assigned to the present administrative divisions of the Maldives. They are not the proper names of the natural atolls that make up these divisions. Some atolls are divided into two administrative divisions while other divisions are made up of two or more natural atolls. The order followed by the code letters is from North to South, beginning with the first letters of the Thaana alphabet used in Dhivehi. These code letters are not accurate from the geographical and cultural point of view. However, they have become popular among tourists and foreigners in the Maldives who find them easier to pronounce than the true atoll names in Dhivehi, (save a few exceptions, like Ari Atoll).

The airport is Madivaru Airport on Madivaru.

References 

 Divehi Tārīkhah Au Alikameh. Divehi Bahāi Tārikhah Khidmaiykurā Qaumī Markazu. Reprint 1958 edn. Malé 1990.
 Divehiraajjege Jōgrafīge Vanavaru. Muhammadu Ibrahim Lutfee. G.Sōsanī.
 Xavier Romero-Frias, The Maldive Islanders, A Study of the Popular Culture of an Ancient Ocean Kingdom. Barcelona 1999.

External links 
 http://www.lhaviyani.gov.mv

Administrative atolls of the Maldives
Atolls of the Maldives